MDC08 is a UHF Citizens' Band Radio (UHF CB) Repeater located on the Central Coast, New South Wales, Australia.

MDC08 provides coverage from Newcastle in the north to south of Sydney in the south and as far west as the Western Suburbs

MDC08 is currently offline and may return soon.

Other nearby repeaters
 VMB2 - Tuggerah Lakes
 CHT01 - AAMI Building Charlestown (Former AMP Building)
 CHT05 - AAMI Building Charlestown (Former AMP Building)
 NEW06 - General Communications Radio Tower Sugarloaf Range

Radio stations in Sydney
Citizens band radio in Australia